"Ain't Talkin' 'bout Dub" is a song by English electronic music group Apollo 440. It was released in February 1997 as the second single from their second studio album, Electro Glide in Blue (1997). Successful on the charts in Europe, it peaked at number one in Romania and within the Top 10 in Denmark, Finland, Norway, Sweden (number two) and the UK.

The song is based on a sample of the lead guitar line of American rock group Van Halen's 1978 song "Ain't Talkin' 'bout Love". The beginning of the song contains a sample from the 1971 SF film The Andromeda Strain. 

The single's front cover features a photograph of Member of Parliament Jeremy Thorpe wearing Jimi Hendrix's Gibson Flying V guitar backstage at a Jimi Hendrix Experience concert at the Royal Festival Hall in 1967.

Critical reception
A reviewer from Music Week rated the song four out of five, adding that "the Scouse beat merchants take the Run DMC route by bolting breakbeats on to a Van Halen track and then layering in some spliffy toasting chatter. Could be huge." Also Daisy & Havoc from the magazine's RM Dance Update gave it four out of five. They concluded with that "anyone who samples Van Halen deserves a good share of this week's votes for that alone, and A440 use this as a basis for several resounding journeys into sound." Gerald Martinez from New Sunday Times noted that on the track, the American rock group's "Ain't Talkin' 'bout Love" "get the techno treatment from Apollo Four Forty who combine that metal-pop tune with reggae dub touches. Hear it to believe it!"

Music video
The accompanying music video for "Ain't Talkin' 'bout Dub" was directed by James Brown and premiered in February 1997.

Track listing
 UK 12" vinyl
 "Ain't Talkin' 'bout Dub" (Matrix Remix) - 6:03
 "Ain't Talkin' 'bout Dub" (@440 Instrumental Version) - 4:59
 "Ain't Talkin' 'bout Dub" (Nok-Hop Remix) - 6:19
 "Ain't Talkin' 'bout Dub" (Booby Trap Remix) - 7:05

 CD single, CD1
"Ain't Talkin' 'bout Dub" (@440 Radio Edit) - 3:56
"Glam" (Rock N Roll Part III) - 8:13
"Ain't Talkin' 'bout Dub" (Matrix Remix) - 6:03
"Ain't Talkin' 'bout Dub" (Nok-Hop Remix) - 6:19

 CD single, CD2
"Ain't Talkin' 'bout Dub" (@440 Instrumental Version) - 5:00
"Ain't Talkin' 'bout Dub" (Armand Van Helden Moonraker Edit) - 6:50
"Ain't Talkin' 'bout Dub" (Escape From New York Edit) - 7:18
"Ain't Talkin' 'bout Dub" (Technology Park Remix) - 5:56
"Ain't Talkin' 'bout Dub" (Joey The Butcher Remix) - 7:04
"Ain't Talkin' 'bout Dub" (Booby Trap Remix) - 7:06

Charts

Weekly charts

Year-end charts

References

1997 songs
1997 singles
Apollo 440 songs
Sony Music UK singles
Number-one singles in Romania
Drum and bass songs
Songs written by Michael Anthony (musician)
Songs written by David Lee Roth
Songs written by Alex Van Halen
Songs written by Eddie Van Halen